Joseph Roy Metheny (March 2, 1955 – August 5, 2017) was an American serial killer and rapist from the Baltimore, Maryland area. While he claimed to have killed 13 people, sufficient evidence was only found to convict him of two murders. Research later confirmed 3 more victims, though he had not been charged with them.

Early life 

Metheny's attorneys said that he had been neglected as a child and that made him depressed, that his father was an alcoholic who was killed in a car accident when Metheny was six, and that his mother had neglected her six children while she worked double shifts outside the home. Metheny said that his parents often sent him to live with other families in "foster-like" arrangements.

Metheny falsely claimed that his mother was dead. His mother said that they were somewhat poor and she had to work hard as a waitress, barmaid, and food truck driver, but she had provided her children with a normal family life, and the children had never gone hungry or been put into homes of other families as Metheny had claimed. She said that Metheny was an above-average student, always polite, and not mean as a child. She said that "he was smart and had a good childhood. If he was neglected, it was his own fault. It was a pretty good home."

Metheny joined the United States Army when he turned 18 in 1973. His mother said that he had served in Germany, although he claimed that he had served a tour in Vietnam and had become addicted to heroin while in an artillery unit there. His mother said that she had no recollection of him serving in Vietnam, and the circumstances of his service were reported as unverified in press reports. American involvement in Vietnam had ended by that time.

Metheny seldom contacted his mother after he joined the Army. She said, "He just kept drifting further and further away. I think the worst thing that ever happened to him was drugs. It's a sad, sad story."

Murders and confessions 

He had been spending time in bars, living with bands of homeless men in makeshift camps in South Baltimore, and spending nearly all of his money on crack cocaine, heroin, and liquor. However, he held a steady job as a forklift driver and was universally described as intelligent, well-spoken, and very well-mannered.

Metheny murdered Cathy Ann Magaziner in 1994, a 39-year-old woman, and buried her body in a shallow grave on the site of the factory where he worked. The body remained there for more than two years. He later said that he had strangled her and that he dug up her skeleton six months later, put her head in a box, and threw it in the trash.

Metheny was tried for murder in a different case in 1995 for allegedly killing Randall Brewer and Randy Piker with an axe at a homeless "tent city" campsite under Baltimore's Hanover Street Bridge. There had been disputes involving rival groups of homeless men, and Larry Amos was convicted of stealing the murder weapon and using it to kill Everett Dowell, another homeless man. The bodies were discovered on August 2, 1995, the same day that Dowell was killed. Amos was arrested and accused of first-degree murder and pleaded guilty to the lesser charge of manslaughter; he was released after serving one year and nine months of an eight-year sentence. A jury concluded in July 1996 that there was insufficient evidence to convict Metheny of murdering Brewer and Piker, but he later said that he was guilty of those murders.

Metheny killed Kimberly Lynn Spicer in mid-November 1996 by stabbing her with a knife. He kidnapped Rita Kemper on December 8, 1996, and attempted to rape her. According to prosecutors, he shared drugs with Kemper in the trailer where he was living at the pallet factory site. She refused to have sex with him and ran out of the trailer, so he chased her, beat her, dragged her back into the trailer, and then pulled down her pants and attempted to rape her. Kemper said he had attempted to murder her, saying: "I'm going to kill you and bury you in the woods with the other girls." She escaped through a window of the trailer and fled to police officers in the area.

Metheny then asked a friend to help him bury the body of Spicer which he had been hiding at the factory site since killing her a month earlier. The friend reported it to the police on December 15, 1996, and Metheny was arrested and charged with his murder the same day. The owner of the business was arrested with Metheny as they left a Christmas party and was charged as an accessory after the fact for allegedly disposing of evidence. Metheny began confessing to other murders, as well as that of Spicer. He led police to the shallow grave where he had reburied Magaziner's decapitated remains. Much of the skull was missing, but the police were able to identify Magaziner from dental records.

Police said that he had chosen young white sex workers who were addicted to heroin and cocaine. The killings also involved brutal sexual assaults. He was indicted for killing Toni Lynn Ingrassia, of age 28, but those charges were later dropped for lack of evidence. He claimed to have also killed three other prostitutes along Washington Boulevard in Baltimore, although there was no evidence of most of those crimes other than his confession. 

He said that he had thrown bodies in the Patapsco River and they had never been found. The Baltimore Sun newspaper reported in 1997 that it was not clear how truthful his claims were about how many people he had killed, although he said that he had killed up to 10 people. His attorney said that he was remorseful and that drugs and alcohol had changed his personality and made him violent.

Sentencing
He was tried in 1997 in the Kemper case and given a sentence of 50 years for kidnapping and attempted sexual assault. He was acquitted of attempting to murder her. He was sentenced to death in 1998 for the murder of Spicer. At his sentencing hearing, he said that he committed murders because he "enjoyed it", he "got a rush out of it, got a high out of it" and "had no real excuse why other than I like to do it".

In August 1998, he pleaded guilty to murdering and robbing Magaziner, and prosecutors sought the death penalty in that case, as well. He received a sentence of life in prison in that case. His death sentence was overturned in 2000, and the sentence for the murder of Spicer was reduced to life without parole. The rationale for the death penalty was that the murder had been committed in committing a robbery, but the evidence indicated that robbery was not his motivation.

Death
Metheny was found dead in his prison cell at the Western Correctional Institution in Cumberland, Maryland, on August 5, 2017.

See also 
 List of serial killers in the United States
 List of serial killers by number of victims

References 

1953 births
2017 deaths
American people convicted of kidnapping
American people convicted of murder
American people convicted of rape
American people who died in prison custody
American rapists
American serial killers
People from Baltimore
Prisoners who died in Maryland detention
Serial killers who died in prison custody